The stellated octahedron is the only stellation  of the octahedron. It is also called the stella octangula (Latin for "eight-pointed star"), a name given to it by Johannes Kepler in 1609, though it was known to earlier geometers. It was  depicted in Pacioli's De Divina Proportione, 1509.

It is the simplest of five regular polyhedral compounds, and the only regular compound of two tetrahedra. It is also the least dense of the regular polyhedral compounds, having a density of 2.

It can be seen as a 3D extension of the hexagram: the hexagram is a two-dimensional shape formed from two overlapping equilateral triangles, centrally symmetric to each other, and in the same way the stellated octahedron can be formed from two centrally symmetric overlapping tetrahedra. This can be generalized to any desired amount of higher dimensions; the four-dimensional equivalent construction is the compound of two 5-cells. It can also be seen as one of the stages in the construction of a 3D Koch snowflake, a fractal shape formed by repeated attachment of smaller tetrahedra to each triangular face of a larger figure. The first stage of the construction of the Koch Snowflake is a single central tetrahedron, and the second stage, formed by adding four smaller tetrahedra to the faces of the central tetrahedron, is the stellated octahedron.

Construction
The Cartesian coordinates of the stellated octahedron are as follows:
(±1/2, ±1/2, 0)
(0, 0, ±1/√2)
(±1, 0, ±1/√2)
(0, ±1, ±1/√2)

The stellated octahedron can be constructed in several ways:
It is a stellation of the regular octahedron, sharing the same face planes. (See Wenninger model W19.)

It is also a regular polyhedron compound, when constructed as the union of two regular tetrahedra (a regular tetrahedron and its dual tetrahedron).
It can be obtained as an augmentation of the regular octahedron, by adding tetrahedral pyramids on each face. In this construction it has the same topology as the convex Catalan solid, the triakis octahedron, which has much shorter pyramids.
It is a facetting of the cube, sharing the vertex arrangement.
It can be seen as a {4/2} antiprism; with {4/2} being a tetragram, a compound of two dual digons, and the tetrahedron seen as a digonal antiprism, this can be seen as a compound of two digonal antiprisms.
It can be seen as a net of a four-dimensional octahedral pyramid, consisting of a central octahedron surrounded by eight tetrahedra.

Related concepts

A compound of two spherical tetrahedra can be constructed, as illustrated.

The two tetrahedra of the compound view of the stellated octahedron are "desmic", meaning that (when interpreted as a line in projective space) each edge of one tetrahedron crosses two opposite edges of the other tetrahedron. One of these two crossings is visible in the stellated octahedron; the other crossing occurs at a point at infinity of the projective space, where each edge of one tetrahedron crosses the parallel edge of the other tetrahedron. These two tetrahedra can be completed to a desmic system of three tetrahedra, where the third tetrahedron has as its four vertices the three crossing points at infinity and the centroid of the two finite tetrahedra. The same twelve tetrahedron vertices also form the points of Reye's configuration.

The stella octangula numbers are figurate numbers that count the number of balls that can be arranged into the shape of a stellated octahedron. They are
0, 1, 14, 51, 124, 245, 426, 679, 1016, 1449, 1990, ....

In popular culture

The stellated octahedron appears with several other polyhedra and polyhedral compounds in M. C. Escher's print "Stars", and provides the central form in Escher's Double Planetoid (1949).

Some modern mystics have associated this shape with the "merkaba", which according to them is a "counter-rotating energy field" named from an ancient Egyptian word. However, the word "merkaba" is actually Hebrew, and more properly refers to a chariot in the visions of Ezekiel.
The resemblance between this shape and the two-dimensional star of David has also been frequently noted.

References

External links 

Polyhedral stellation
Polyhedral compounds